is a  mountain of Ōmine Mountain Range, located on the border of Kurotaki and Kawakami, Nara, Japan. This mountain is one of the Kinki 100 mountains. This mountain is on the route of Ōmine Okugakemichi.

Ōtenjō literally means ‘the great ceiling’.

Route 

There are three major routes to the top of this mountain. The most popular route is from Dorokawa, Kurotaki via Gobanzeki and it takes three hours and 15 minutes to the top. Another route is also from Dorokawa via Mount Iwaya and it takes three hours. The other route is from north via Mount Shisuniwa from Yoshinoyama Station, but it takes seven and half hours.

Access 
 Dorokawa Bus Stop of Nara Kotsu
 Yoshinoyama Station of Yoshino Ohmine ke-buru Ropeway

Gallery

References
 Omine, Daitaka, Odaigahara
 Official Home Page of the Geographical Survey Institute in Japan

Otenjo